The Inttranet is a multilingual portal for and global network of professional interpreters and translators, fully compatible with ISO 9001 quality assurance requirements, and was officially inaugurated in October 2002.

Its purpose is to provide all the functions required by professional interpreters and translators and the users of their services, and to enable access to those services in any language, in accordance with UNESCO's "Access to All" program.

Launched after two years of development, with input from the heads of the translation departments of UNESCO, the European Commission, the Council of Europe, the European Parliament (freelance section), and professional interpreters and translators from 26 countries, the portal is currently (2006) available in 33 languages, but has been designed to be translated and interoperable in any other.

One of the unique features of the Inttranet is the capacity to automatically display member CVs in the language of the visitor to the portal.

The portal also includes a multilingual terminology database (Terminal), compatible with ISO 12616, designed to store and share specific translation terms used by Inttranet members and their customers. It is capable of displaying the search interface as well as the source and target terms in any three different languages.

The Inttranet also comprises an external search system linked to Inttranet CVs that can be hosted as a piece of HTML code on any third-party website (Exttranet), thereby constituting a genuinely global (multilingual) search and display system for users of the services of professional interpreters and translators.

The portal was approved for inclusion in the UNESCO Observatory for the Information Society in January 2006.

External links
Inttranet Home Page

Translation